R393 road may refer to:
 R393 road (Ireland)
 R393 road (South Africa)